The Grande Prêmio Brasil Caixa de Atletismo is an annual athletics event in Belém, Brazil as part of the IAAF World Challenge. It was first organized in 1985, held at the Estádio Ícaro de Castro Melo, São Paulo.
From 1998 to 2009 IAAF classified the Grande Prêmio Brasil Caixa de Atletismo among IAAF Grand Prix meetings.

Editions

Meeting records

Men

Women

References

External links
 
 Grande Prêmio Brasil Caixa de Atletismo from the IAAF World Challenge homepage
 Grande Prêmio Brasil Caixa de Atletismo Meeting Records

Annual track and field meetings
IAAF Grand Prix
IAAF World Challenge
Athletics competitions in Brazil
Recurring sporting events established in 1985
IAAF World Outdoor Meetings
1985 establishments in Brazil